José Assis (January 2, 1962 – August 19, 2007), best known as Zezé Assis, was an Angolan basketball player. Assis, a small forward, competed for Angola at the 1981, 1985, 1987 and 1989 AfroBaskets as well as at the 1986 FIBA World Championship.

At the club level, he played for Leões de Luanda, alongside Angolan basketball giant José Carlos Guimarães, having won two national championships, in 1982 and 1984. The club's name later reverted to its original Sporting Clube de Luanda.

On August 19, 2007, Assis died of a long disease, at the age of 45 in Luanda.

See also
 Angolan Basketball Federation
 List of Angola basketball squads

References

1962 births
2007 deaths
Angolan men's basketball players
Basketball players from Luanda
Sporting Clube de Luanda basketball players
Small forwards
1986 FIBA World Championship players